Želivského is a station on Line A of the Prague Metro. The station is located under Vinohradská street next to the Olšany Cemetery. It is named after the Jana Želivského street, which is itself named after Jan Želivský. The station was opened on 19 December 1980 as the eastern terminus of the extension of the line from Náměstí Míru. On 11 July 1987 the line was extended to Strašnická.

Characteristics 
The station is a three-bore buttressed tunnel with ten pairs of boarding and deboarding accesses. It is 148 meters long in total, but the boarding platform spans only 100 meters. The walls of the station are covered with brown and gold, anodized, aluminum mouldings. The single lobby under Vinohradská Avenue is 5.6 meters underground. The lobby is connected to the street by three exits with escalators and to the platform by one long tunnel with escalators running in both directions. Behind the station are two hold yards and one reverse track capable of storing an entire train. Extension of the A-line to the Strašnická Station was achieved by boring tunnels from these auxiliary spaces. The reverse track is still used for reversing and storing trains even though the Želivského Station is no longer the terminus of the line. The construction of the station in 1980 cost approximately 301 million Czech crowns.

The station has not been renovated since its construction and therefore still exhibits the original design of the first versions of the A-line. The system of overhead lighting units in the escalator tunnel along with the aluminum paneled walls function as a damper against the sound of the escalators which are loud by design. The lower spaces of the station have been subject to leaks which have in turn caused rust on the aluminum panels.

Gallery

References

Prague Metro stations
Railway stations opened in 1980
1980 establishments in Czechoslovakia
Railway stations in the Czech Republic opened in the 20th century